Stereomerus is a genus of longhorn beetles of the subfamily Lamiinae, containing the following species:

 Stereomerus brachypterus Martins & Galileo, 1994
 Stereomerus diadelus Martins & Galileo, 1994
 Stereomerus hovorei Martins & Galileo, 2006
 Stereomerus lineatus (Breuning, 1940)
 Stereomerus maculatus Galileo & Martins, 2003
 Stereomerus melzeri Martins & Galileo, 1994
 Stereomerus pachypezoides Melzer, 1934

References

Desmiphorini